The Kemmerer Hotel in Kemmerer, Wyoming was a hotel having historic status—it was added to the National Register of Historic Places—which was nonetheless demolished in 2003. The hotel nonetheless remained on the National Register until 2013, when it was delisted.

It was located at Pine and Sapphire in Kemmerer.   It was built during 1897–98.

It was listed on the National Register of Historic Places in 1985.

References 

Hotel buildings on the National Register of Historic Places in Wyoming
Hotel buildings completed in 1898
Buildings and structures in Lincoln County, Wyoming
Hotels in Wyoming
1898 establishments in Wyoming
National Register of Historic Places in Lincoln County, Wyoming
Kemmerer, Wyoming
Demolished buildings and structures in Wyoming
Buildings and structures demolished in 2003
Former National Register of Historic Places in Wyoming
2003 disestablishments in Wyoming